Oru Black and White Kudumbam is a 2009 Indian Malayalam film by Shaiju Anthikkad starring Jayasurya and Kalabhavan Mani.

Plot 
Oru Black & White Kudumbam movie is about a handsome guy Adithya Varma who is the son of a dark-skinned father Antony and fair mother Lakshmi. Antony is a lorry driver, is a man who has a complex about his colour, more so since as his wife, who belongs to a Kovilakam family, is fair and beautiful.

This family is known as 'Oru Black and White Kudumbam' in their neighborhood and the basic plot revolves around the backdrop of tensions that Antony creates in his house in the name of colour.

Cast 
Jayasurya as Antony Adithya Varma
Kalabhavan Mani as Antony
Bhama as Minnu
Vinaya Prasad as Lakshmi
Lalu Alex as Varma
Janardhanan as Madhava Varma
Suraj Venjaramood as Manjula Kumaran/Manjulan
Anoop Chandran as Peethambaran
Bijukuttan as Kakka Thampuran
Narayanankutty as a worker in Minnus group
Kochu Preman as Cheriachan
Ponnamma Babu as Rahul's mother and Madhava Varma's wife
Kottayam Nazeer
Kollam Thulasi as Police Officer
Manka Mahesh
Sudheesh as Rahul/Thomas Mathew
Lakshmi Priya  
Krishna Praba
Manju Pillai

References

External links 
 http://popcorn.oneindia.in/title/1419/oru-black-white-kudumbam.html
 http://www.nowrunning.com/movie/6233/malayalam/oru-black-and-white-kudumbam/review.htm
 http://in.movies.yahoo.com/news-detail/37851/Oru-Black-And-White-Kudumbam.html

2009 films
2000s Malayalam-language films